Mapah may refer to:

 Ha-Mapah (Hebrew: "the tablecloth"), a commentary on the Shulchan Aruch by Moses Isserles
 The Mapah, title of the French mystic Simon Ganneau (1805-1851)

See also
 Mapa (disambiguation)
 Mappa (disambiguation)